Vishaka Sri Sarada Peetham, also called the Sarada Peetham  is a Hindu institution, located in Chinnamushidiwada, Visakhapatnam, Andhra Pradesh. its dedicated to goddess Raja Shyamala Devi  and  Sri Sharada.

About
this peetham was started by Swami Swaroopanandendra Saraswati in the year of 1997 and following temples were inside the peetham. India's only one temple of Raja Shyamala Devi  is situated hear the deity of Raja Shyamala Devi is symbol for Crown.

 Raja Shyamala Devi 
 Sri Medha Dakshina Murthy
 Sri Sarada Devi
 Ganapathi
 Adi Shankara		
 Sri Vana Durga		
 Sri Valli Deva Sena Shanmuka Subrahmanya Swamy
 Sri Dasa Anjaneya Swamy		
 Sri Krishna		
 Sri Datta Treya
 Sri Kala Bhairava		
 Jammy Vruksham		
 Naga Devatha
 Thandava Murthy

Notable Followers
Sarada Peetham is impact significant role in Andhra Pradesh and Telangana including both states Chief minister's are follower of this peetham.

 Y. S. Jaganmohan Reddy
 K. Chandrashekar Rao
 Ram Madhav
 T. Subbarami Reddy
 Suman

References

External links
http://www.srisaradapeetham.org/

Hindu temples in Visakhapatnam district
Hindu monasteries in India
Advaita Vedanta